Tony Vincent (born 1973) is an American actor, songwriter, and singer based in New York City and Nashville.

Early career
Vincent was born in Albuquerque, New Mexico. His professional career began while attending Belmont University in Nashville, Tennessee. Using the school's recording studio, he recorded what became his first single, "Love Falling Down". It was originally released only to his hometown radio station, KLYT in Albuquerque. The song proved popular. When it hit No. 1 on that station's charts, he and a college friend hastily organized a campaign to release the single nationally. The single was released nationwide in May 1993 and appeared on the national CCM Billboard Hot 100 in July 1993, becoming the first independently released single ever to do so. After signing a recording contract with Star Song Records / EMI, Vincent spent six more years recording in Nashville. During that time, Vincent had six #1 songs on Billboards radio charts and his song, "One Deed", from the album of the same name, was featured in a United Way of America campaign.

Musical theatre

In 1998, Vincent moved to New York, and by March 1998 had landed a role in the American touring production of Rent. In January 1999, Vincent returned to New York and made his Broadway debut in the cast of Rent at the Nederlander Theatre, understudying the role of Roger, and later took over the role of Mark.

In 2000, Vincent was cast in the role of Simon Zealotes in the film remake of Jesus Christ Superstar in London; he was one of two Americans to be cast in the film (along with Frederick B. Owens). This new production brought about a revival of the show on Broadway, and Vincent and several of his castmates from the film were asked to star in it. Vincent was again cast as Simon, understudying the lead roles of Jesus and Judas, but was moved up to the lead role of Judas in a change just three and a half weeks before opening night (due to Jason Pebworth, the initially cast Judas, leaving the show) at composer Andrew Lloyd Webber's request. Vincent's performance as Judas won him a nomination for an Outer Critics award for "Best Featured Actor". Impressed with his Broadway performances, Webber selected Vincent to travel through China in 2001, introducing the composer's music in a cultural exchange production later released on DVD as Andrew Lloyd Webber-Masterpiece (Live in Beijing).

In 2001, Vincent landed the lead role of Galileo Figaro in Queen's musical, We Will Rock You on London's West End.  He performed the role from May 2002 through November 2003. Vincent also performed "Bohemian Rhapsody" with Queen for the band's June 2002 appearance at Party at the Palace, a celebration of Queen Elizabeth's 50th anniversary as monarch.

The North American premiere of We Will Rock You opened in Las Vegas in 2004. Vincent remained with the show until July 2005, when he returned to New York City to resume work on his solo music career. During the Vegas residency, Vincent met Aspen Miller, who would become his wife until their divorce in 2020.

Vincent originated the role of St. Jimmy in American Idiot, the Tony award-winning stage musical based on Green Day's award-winning album of the same name. The production premiered at the Berkeley Repertory Theatre in September 2009 and, after being extended twice, became Berkeley Rep's most popular and highest grossing production.

When American Idiot opened on Broadway at the St. James Theatre on April 20, 2010, Tony Vincent received considerable praise for his portrayal of St. Jimmy. Charles Isherwood of the New York Times praised the show as "performed with galvanizing intensity by a terrific cast, … a pulsating portrait of wasted youth that invokes all the standard genre conventions … only to transcend them through the power of its music and the artistry of its execution," and describing performance as having "mesmerizing vitality and piercing vocalism." Peter Travers of Rolling Stone, in his review of American Idiot, wrote "the standout is vocal powerhouse Tony Vincent as St. Jimmy, Johnny's dealer and toxic id....   American Idiot...cuts its own path to the heart. You won't know what hit you.  American Idiot knows no limits – it's a global knockout."

In April 2010, Vincent, along with co-star John Gallagher, Jr., received a 2010 Drama League Award nomination for the Distinguished Performance Award.

Vincent played his final performance as St. Jimmy on December 30, 2010, and was succeeded by Green Day frontman Billie Joe Armstrong. The show closed on Broadway on April 24, 2011, but continues to tour globally with tour-exclusive casts.

Vincent made his return to Broadway in the production of Rocktopia from March 20 to April 29, 2018.

Music career

Vincent released three solo albums during the 90's – Love Falling Down (1993), Tony Vincent (1995) and One Deed (1997).

In 2007 Vincent released a five-song EP entitled A Better Way, a collaboration with platinum-selling producer Adam Anders and songwriter Nate Campany, and in 2012, he released his highly anticipated studio project, In My Head, which he co-produced with Swedish artist Ulf Dernevik.

Side projects

In 2005, the multi-platinum vocal group Il Divo included the song, Hoy Que Ya No Estas Aqui (As Far As Any Man Can See), co-written by Vincent and Jorgen Elofsson (translation by Rudy Perez), on their self-titled debut album.

Tony has been successful in the voice over world, and, to date, has done voice over work for Pepperidge Farm, Mrs Fields and for the Fisher-Price interactive game, I Can Play Guitar.

Vincent has been a guest artist with The SAS Band for several live concerts in the UK. He is also a recurring guest artist at the Vanemuine Theater in Tartu, Estonia.

Vincent supports the work of the Broadway Dreams Foundation and regularly participates in their intensive theatre training courses as a faculty member and guest instructor.

The Voice
Vincent was a contestant on the second season of the hit reality talent show The Voice. Cee Lo Green was so impressed by Vincent's powerful (blind audition) performance of We Are The Champions that he snatched him up for his Team (TeamCeeLo) and commented that Freddie Mercury would have been proud. Vincent won his Battle Round against teammate Justin Hopkins singing Journey's "Faithfully".

During the Live round, Vincent sang Tears for Fears' "Everybody Wants to Rule the World", but received mixed reviews from the judges, who felt the song held back his true voice dynamic. Vincent ended up in the Sing-Off of the Last Chance Performances, singing Eurythmics' "Sweet Dreams", but was eliminated from the competition.

Discography

Filmography

Stage work

Television

References

External links
 
 https://m.imdb.com/name/nm0898778
 

American male musical theatre actors
American male stage actors
1973 births
21st-century American singers
20th-century American singers
Living people
The Voice (franchise) contestants
Male actors from Albuquerque, New Mexico
Musicians from Albuquerque, New Mexico
20th-century American male singers
21st-century American male singers